Shatti Al-Qurum (also written Shatti Al-Qurm) is the most expensive residential locality situated on the coast of Muscat, the capital of the Sultanate of Oman. It is also known as Muscat's Diplomatic District due to many embassies being located there.

Shatti Al-Qurum is bordered by Qurum to the east, the Ministries and Embassies to the west and Madinat Qaboos to the south. It is a recent development, begun in the mid-1980s. The most noticeable sight while driving down the Sultan Qaboos Highway used to be the Intercontinental Hotel but today several other significant constructions have been built. Shatti is also the home of several more hotels including the Grand Hyatt,W Hotel Muscat, Crowne Plaza and budget hotels such as Days Inn. After PDO, this is the most popular destination for expatriates living in Muscat. The common and unique feature to Shatti is the ocean of white houses.  Royal Opera House Muscat, cinema, theatre, schools and a hospital are also located there.

References

Suburbs of Muscat, Oman